Douglas Vaughn Broxson (born March 10, 1949) is an American politician who is a Republican member of the Florida Senate, representing the 1st district, which includes Escambia, Santa Rosa, and part of Okaloosa Counties in the Florida Panhandle, since 2016. He previously served in the Florida House of Representatives, representing northern Okaloosa County and Santa Rosa County from 2010 to 2016.

History
Broxson was born in Pensacola. After attending Pensacola Junior College, Broxson transferred to Evangel University in Springfield, Missouri, where he met his wife, Mary, and graduated in 1971. He moved back to Florida and raised his family, starting a career in real estate and insurance sales.

Florida Legislature

House of Representatives 
In 2010, when incumbent state representative Greg Evers could not seek re-election due to term limits, instead successfully running for the Florida State Senate, Broxson ran to succeed him in the Republican primary in the 1st District, which included northern Escambia County, northwestern Okaloosa County, and Santa Rosa County. He faced Greg Brown, Ferdinand Salomon, and Ricky Perritt, whom he defeated with 45% of the vote. In the general election, Broxson defeated independent candidate Matthias Venditto and won in a landslide, receiving 84% of the vote.

When Florida House districts were reconfigured in 2012, Broxson ran in the newly created 3rd District, which included most of the territory that he had represented in the 1st District but dropped the sections of Escambia County in favor of a greater slice of Okaloosa County. He faced Jayer Williamson, the son of Santa Rosa County commissioner Jim Williamson, in the Republican primary, and won with 58% of the vote. He did not face an opponent in the general election and won in a landslide.

While serving in the legislature, Broxson supported legislation that would allow communities "to fine motorists who play their car stereos too loudly" despite concerns that it would lead to racial discrimination, noting, "This has been an existing law for a long time. Let's don't make it more than it is. It's worked for years. It's given them the ability to keep peace in the cities [and] keep our neighborhoods quiet and peaceful."

In 2014, Broxson was challenged in the Republican primary by Jamie Smith, a Tea Party activist and veteran. He campaigned on his conservative record in the legislature of reducing government regulation and spending, saying, "[The legislature] stood up against Obamacare and did everything good Republicans are supposed to do." Broxson said that, in his third term, he would focus on leading the charge on additional tax reform." He ended up defeating Smith in a landslide, winning 70% of the vote, and advanced to the general election, where he only faced write-in opposition and won re-election easily.

Senate 
In 2016, Broxson again succeed Greg Evers when Evers opted to run unsuccessfully for Florida's 1st congressional district rather than seek re-election in his reconfigured Senate district. Broxson defeated fellow state representative Mike Hill in the Republican primary and two write-in candidates in the general election.

On March 3, 2018, Broxson rejected a two-year moratorium on the sale of AR-15s.

Election history

2010

2012

2014

2016

2022

References

External links
Florida House of Representatives – Doug Broxson
Broxson for State House

|-

|-

1949 births
Living people
Republican Party Florida state senators
Republican Party members of the Florida House of Representatives
Pensacola Junior College alumni
People from Pensacola, Florida
Businesspeople from Florida
American Pentecostals
Evangel University alumni
People from Gulf Breeze, Florida
21st-century American politicians